The Esquadrão Aeroterrestre de Salvamento (EAS), known by its nickname Para-SAR, is a Brazilian Air Force special operations search and rescue squadron, based in the city of Campo Grande.

The unit has no aircraft of its own and its airborne personnel conduct operations by being dropped from other units' aircraft. The unit has seven SAR teams located in seven states.

Each Para-SAR detachment is made up of SAR qualified military parachutists. Members of this unit can be distinguished by their maroon berets and orange baseball caps.

History 
The Brazilian Air Force has a long history of parachute training. In 1943, at the former Afonsos Field School of Aeronautics and with the support of the Air Force, cadet academy instructor Achile Garcia Charles Astor first introduced civil parachute training in Brazil.

Seeing the usefulness of having a parachuting unit, the Electronics and Flight Protection Administration conducted studies to see how such a unit could be created under the auspices of the air force. The results of that study gave rise to the Para-SAR.

In 1946, the Brazilian Army formed its parachute school, the now-named General Penha Brazil Parachutist's Instruction Center. It graduated its first class of Brazilian Air Force students in 1959.

The group initially consisted of a division of three officers and five sergeants whose mandate was to provide instruction to the cadets of the School of Aeronautics and to provide search and rescue, by means of the DEPV. The unit also consisted of a group of volunteers who trained at the old military aviation school and went on to provide help in accidents and under special circumstances.

Eventually, on 2 September 1963, the Airborne Rescue unit was formed. Para-SAR is the traditional name given to the search and rescue arm of the air force and is housed in the old School of Aeronautics.

By November 20, 1973, the flotilla no longer existed, becoming the Airborne Rescue Squadron, or EAS. Its mandate was to continue training of the BAF parachutists, the instruction and the administration of the rescue teams and helicopter squadrons among other tasks.

Mission 
The Para-SAR mandate includes specialized instruction for crewmembers and rescue teams of the Brazilian Air Force, SAR and special operations.

Training 
New members of the squadron start with the Brazilian Army parachute course and then complete courses such as parachute packing and maintenance, aerial resupply, demolition, sniper and jungle warfare. They then move onto advanced training. The following training programs are offered by the squadron:

Search and rescue 

This course includes: aircraft access; firefighting; machines, engines and radio equipment; free diving; helilift operations; orientation and ground searches; sea and jungle survival; SAR combat tactics; mountaineering; search and rescue theory and first aid.

Scuba diving 

Graduates become qualified in scuba diving which is typically used to recover charges and pieces of submerged aircraft.

Airborne techniques 

Graduates are qualified to parachute out of a military aircraft as well as air drop supplies, precision landing, calculate the effects of wind and carry out the pathfinder role. They also learn packing, inspecting and repairing parachutes. Also taught are techniques for aircraft operations using the Lockheed C-130 Hercules and C-95.

Skydiving 

The course teaches parachutists operational skydiving, the use of instruments and equipment; skydiving from both low and high altitudes and jumping with weapons and equipment for military operations.

Master skydiver 

Graduates of this course become qualified in all aspects of skydiving, from organizing the jump team to coordinating the aircraft to be used. Students are also given a knowledge of meteorology and reading weather reports as well as precision targeting, advanced navigation skills and techniques of free fall Basic Body Fly.

Commando 

The Brazilian Air Force commando course teaches combat search and rescue, including locating downed crews in a hostile environment, survival, evasion, resistance and escape. The course also covers counter-terrorism, reconnaissance and sabotage subjects.

Badges

See also 
List of special forces units
United States Air Force Pararescue
Unit 669

References

External links 
  EsquadrÃo Aeroterrestre De Salvamento Para-SAR 
 Esquadrão PÁra-Sar 

Air force special forces units
Rescue aviation
Special forces of Brazil